Martí Batres Guadarrama (born 26 January 1967) is a Mexican politician. He is the former President of the National Regeneration Movement (MORENA) and served as Deputy of the LXII Legislature of the Mexican Congress representing the Federal District, as well as the Legislative Assembly of the Federal District.

Career
He was the President of the Senate in the LXIV Legislature of the Mexican Congress.

References

1967 births
Living people
Politicians from Mexico City
Members of the Chamber of Deputies (Mexico)
Presidents of the Senate of the Republic (Mexico)
Party of the Democratic Revolution politicians
Morena (political party) politicians
21st-century Mexican politicians
20th-century Mexican politicians
Members of the Congress of Mexico City